Justice League Heroes: The Flash is a side-story video game which complements the main events during Justice League Heroes of the PlayStation 2 and Xbox consoles. It features Wally West / Flash as the playable character, and assistant NPC's such as Superman, Wonder Woman, Martian Manhunter, Black Canary, Green Arrow and Batman.

Plot summary
It covers what the Flash was doing while the other Justice League members were on missions. By the first level, Martian Manhunter warns Flash about a robot invasion in Keystone City, led by Gorilla Grodd.

During the second level, Superman and Batman are investigating a break-in at S.T.A.R. Labs while Gotham City is being attacked by both regular criminals and robots. There, Flash confronts Killer Frost.

By the third level, the Martian asks Flash to help Themyscira, Wonder Woman's home island, where the sorceress Circe has taken over and turned all the guards into animals, and he's joined by Green Arrow. Circe slips that Brainiac is behind the plot, but doesn't give further details.

At this time, the Martian Manhunter is with Superman on Mars, fighting the white martians and Flash talks with Batman. The Dark Knight informs him about some floods across the Pacific, and Flash goes to investigate. Once there, he finds and confronts Zoom.

After this, Flash talks to Black Canary. Brainiac had invaded the Justice League Watchtower and was just driven away. She tells Flash that Superman will meet up with him, and Flash challenges him to a race.

Once there, Superman is nowhere to be found, so Flash starts searching for him at Metropolis. Instead of Superman, Flash finds Brainiac, or at least one of his powered avatars. Brainiac mocks Flash, telling him about a bomb programmed to blow up and destroy Metropolis within two minutes, which leaves the player with two minutes to beat the final boss of the game. The rest of the story continues in the standard Justice League Heroes.

Reception
The GBA version received generally positive critical response, with an average of 70% on Gamerankings.

Footnotes

External links

2006 video games
Batman video games
Game Boy Advance games
Game Boy Advance-only games
Video games based on DC Comics
Heroes: The Flash
Superman video games
Video games developed in the United States
Superhero video games
Flash (comics) in other media
Warner Bros. video games
Video games set in the United States
WayForward games
Single-player video games